Bay Harbor is a ghost town in Bay County, Florida, United States.

Overview 
Bay Harbor was a small settlement mostly centered on the paper mill that was here at the site. Bay Harbor is currently part of the Panama City Paper Mill.

References

Ghost towns in Florida
Bay County, Florida